Junior Malili "Mils" Muliaina (born 31 July 1980) is a former professional rugby union player who most recently played for San Francisco Rush in the US PRO Rugby competition. He played primarily as a fullback, though he has also played as a centre and on the wing.

Born in Salelesi, Samoa, Muliaina moved with his family to Invercargill, New Zealand, at the age of three. Muliaina became only the second All Black to reach 100 caps during the World Cup quarter-final against  in 2011. He scored 33 tries for New Zealand and remains among the top 30 highest try scorers in rugby union.

Early career
He first attended Cargill High School then Southland Boys' High School, where he proved proficient enough at rugby to be offered a scholarship to Kelston Boys' High School in Auckland, in 1998. Subsequently, Muliaina played for the NZ Secondary Schools XV, the team winning that year's world championship. He repeated this the following year with the Under 19 side, and in 2000 and 2001 was part of the world champion Under 21 (NZ Colt) teams of those years.

Super Rugby and the All Blacks
Muliaina joined the Auckland Blues in 2001 and was a part of the Super 12 title-winning team for the Blues in 2003. Muliaina's test debut for the All Blacks was against England on 14 June 2003 at the Westpac Stadium in Wellington. He was subsequently part of the All Black squad at the 2003 Rugby World Cup. In 2004, he was the only player to be selected for every test played by the All Blacks. Muliaina has also played in 11 tournaments for the sevens team, including winning a Commonwealth Games gold medal in 2002 in Manchester. Though he has expressed a preference for playing as an outside centre, Muliaina generally plays at fullback. In 2006 he joined the Chiefs, with whom he brought up his 100th Super Rugby cap in 2011.

On 9 October 2011 during the 2011 Rugby World Cup, Muliaina played his 100th game for the All Blacks after starting at fullback against Argentina. During the game, Muliaina was forced from the field at half-time, having injured his shoulder. This was later revealed to have been fractured, meaning he was dropped from the New Zealand World Cup squad. Muliaina retired from the All Blacks squad the following day on 10 October 2011 after achieving his 100th Test cap and returned on 23 October 2011 to claim his gold medal after the All Blacks won the 2011 Rugby World Cup Final.

Europe
As of 4 May 2014, Mils had signed a one-year contract for Irish provincial region Connacht in the Pro12. On 21 November 2014, Muliaina made his Connacht debut in a 43–3 win over Italian side Zebre at the Sportgrounds.

United States
It was announced in March 2016 that Muliaina would play the upcoming season in the United States in the newly formed PRO Rugby competition. He joined the San Francisco Rush midway through the inaugural 2016 season.

Achievements
 Under 21 Rugby World Champion (2000 & 2001)
 Commonwealth Games Gold Medal, Sevens Rugby (2002)
 IRB Sevens World Series Champion (1999, 2000 & 2001)
 ITM Cup (also known as the National Provincial Championship, NPC) Champion (Auckland: 1999, 2002, 2005; Waikato: 2006)
 Super Rugby Champion (2003 with )
 NZ Super Rugby Player of the Year (2009)
 106 Super Rugby caps (Blues and Chiefs)
 Tri-Nations Champion (2003, 2005, 2006, 2007, 2008 & 2010)
 British & Irish Lions series victory (2005)
 Grand Slam (2005, 2008 & 2010)
 IRB Player of the Year Nominee (2010)
 Rugby World Cup Champion (2011)
 100 All Black Test caps (3 as captain)

References

External links
 
 Mils Muliaina | Rugby Database Profile

1980 births
Living people
Auckland rugby union players
Blues (Super Rugby) players
Chiefs (rugby union) players
Commonwealth Games gold medallists for New Zealand
Commonwealth Games medallists in rugby sevens
Commonwealth Games rugby sevens players of New Zealand
Connacht Rugby players
Expatriate rugby union players in Ireland
Expatriate rugby union players in Japan
Expatriate rugby union players in the United States
New Zealand expatriate rugby union players
New Zealand expatriate sportspeople in the United States
New Zealand expatriate sportspeople in Japan
New Zealand expatriate sportspeople in Ireland
New Zealand international rugby sevens players
New Zealand international rugby union players
New Zealand male rugby sevens players
New Zealand rugby union players
NTT DoCoMo Red Hurricanes Osaka players
People educated at Aurora College (Invercargill)
People educated at Kelston Boys' High School
People educated at Southland Boys' High School
Rugby sevens players at the 2002 Commonwealth Games
Rugby union centres
Rugby union fullbacks
Rugby union players from Invercargill
Rugby union wings
Samoan emigrants to New Zealand
San Francisco Rush players
Waikato rugby union players
Zebre Parma players
Medallists at the 2002 Commonwealth Games